Y'all Caught? The Ones That Got Away 1979–1985 was singer-songwriter John Hiatt's first greatest hits album, released in 1989.  It features music from the albums Slug Line, Two Bit Monsters, All of a Sudden, Riding with the King, and Warming Up to the Ice Age.

Critical reception

Mike DeGagne of AllMusic writes, "As far as compilations go, Y'all Caught is a friendly romp through Hiatt's early days and is good to have in the collection."

Robert Christgau grades the album a B+ and says, "his greatest misses are catchy, clever, even compassionate when you listen hard."

Track listing

Personnel

Track information and credits adapted from the album's liner notes.

References

1989 greatest hits albums
John Hiatt albums
Geffen Records compilation albums